Puthambur  is a village in the 
Avadaiyarkoilrevenue block of Pudukkottai district, Tamil Nadu, India.

Demographics 

As per the 2001 census, Puthambur had a total population of 3040 with 1517 males and 1523 females. Out of the total population 1931 people were literate.

References

Villages in Pudukkottai district